Isaac Fisher Curtis (born October 20, 1950) is an American former professional football player who was a wide receiver and spent his entire National Football League (NFL) career with the Cincinnati Bengals (1973–1984).

Early life
Isaac Curtis was a star running back as well as hurdler that set a conferenve record lasting years at Santa Ana High School in California. In 1985 his former coach called him "the best running back to ever play in Orange County.

College career
Curtis received a football scholarship to the University of California, Berkeley. For three years, he excelled as a member of Cal's track team, and he was a running back and kick returner for the football team.

After he finished his junior season, Curtis transferred to San Diego State University because of the controversy surrounding the probation of Cal's football team. He excelled as a slot wide receiver during his senior season under the famed Aztecs coach Don Coryell, who moved him from running back to receiver. In his senior year, Curtis caught 44 passes for 832 yards and seven touchdowns.

NFL Draft
Entering the 1973 NFL Draft, the Cincinnati Bengals needed a wide receiver who had speed to spread the field and opposing defenses for quarterback Ken Anderson. Curtis had world-class speed, running the 100-yard dash in 9.3 seconds as a member of Cal's track team. Curtis also recorded a time of 20.7 seconds in the 200-meter dash in Los Angeles in 1970.

Although Curtis had played only one year at wide receiver, Bengals coach and general manager Paul Brown decided to take a chance on him and drafted Curtis in the first round (15th overall). Later in his career, Paul Brown said that what he liked the most about Isaac Curtis was not so much his athleticism but his always quietly confident personality, saying "He's a very gentle person...no jumping up and down, spiking it, or trash talking".

Professional career
Isaac Curtis made the starting lineup as a rookie and had a superb season, recording 45 receptions for 843 yards, an average of 18.7 yards per catch, and nine touchdowns. .

In Curtis' second season, he caught 30 passes for 630 yards (a 21.1 yard-per-catch average) and a career-best 10 touchdowns.

Curtis' most productive season was in 1975, when he caught 44 passes for 934 yards for a league-leading and career-best 21.2 yard-per-catch average, along with scoring seven touchdowns.

He had another big year in 1976, with 41 receptions for 766 yards and six touchdowns, including a career-long 85-yard touchdown reception.

In 1977, Curtis was limited by injury to 20 catches in eight games, but bounced back in 1978 with a career-best 47 receptions along with 737 yards and three touchdowns.

He continued to play a major part in the Bengals' passing games until his 11th and final NFL season, 1984, when he had 12 receptions.

Curtis helped lead the Bengals to a Super Bowl appearance in the 1981 season and had a solid performance in Super Bowl XVI, catching three passes for 42 yards. Years after his retirement, his quarterback Ken Anderson said that Isaac Curtis was "The Jerry Rice before Jerry Rice".

In his 12 NFL seasons, Curtis totaled 416 receptions for 7,101 yards and 53 touchdowns, while also gaining 76 rushing yards on 25 carries.

His 17.1 yards per catch average is a Bengals record and his 7,101 receiving yards was a franchise record until broken by Chad Johnson on September 16, 2007. His 53 touchdown receptions were a Bengals record until surpassed by Carl Pickens in the late 1990s.

The Isaac Curtis rule
"The Isaac Curtis rule" should not be confused with the "Mel Blount rule", which was a stricter revision of "The Isaac Curtis Rule". Because Isaac Curtis had world-class speed there were no defensive backs who could keep up with him; all of the teams would double and sometimes even triple cover him. In 1973 in his first year, the Bengals won the Central Division and faced the eventual Super Bowl Champions, the Miami Dolphins. Don Shula's defensive backs did not have the speed to cover Curtis and Shula decided that he would have them push, bump, and hold him down the field. After that game, NFL defenses, including the Steelers started doing the same thing to stop Curtis. Paul Brown wanted the rule changed telling the NFL Competition Committee, "What good is it for us to have performers, if they aren't allowed to perform."

"The Isaac Curtis Rule" states that a defender is allowed to block a receiver within five yards of the line of scrimmage. After the initial yards any contact will be considered holding, which is a five-yard penalty and an automatic first down.

"He changed the game," said former Bengals teammate and wide receiver Cris Collinsworth. "There's no question because no one could keep up with him. They put in the five-yard bump rules and all that crazy stuff that it all eventually became".

After football
Curtis is a sales executive for Winegardner and Hammons, Inc., a hotel management company in the Cincinnati suburb of Blue Ash. He has lived in the North Avondale section of Cincinnati for over 20 years.

External links
Curtis' stats
Bengals all-time leading receivers

References

1950 births
Living people
Sportspeople from Santa Ana, California
Players of American football from California
American football wide receivers
California Golden Bears football players
San Diego State Aztecs football players
Cincinnati Bengals players
American Conference Pro Bowl players